Oscar Lee Gobern (born 26 January 1991) is an English footballer who plays as a midfielder for Havant & Waterlooville. 

He played at EFL Championship level for Southampton, Huddersfield Town and Queens Park Rangers, as well as playing in the Scottish Premiership with Ross County. He also played in the Football League for Milton Keynes Dons, Chesterfield, Doncaster Rovers, Mansfield Town and Yeovil Town, before moving into non-league football with Eastleigh, Dover Athletic and Havant & Waterlooville. He has been capped once by the England U19's.

Career

Southampton
Gobern was born in Birmingham and joined the Southampton F.C. Academy after a brief spell with Aston Villa. He made his league début as a substitute at Deepdale against Preston North End on 1 November 2008, as the "Saints" came from 2–0 down to claim a 3–2 victory.

After making seven appearances the season earlier, Gobern made his first appearance of the 2009–10 season in a 1–1 draw with Millwall, making a further two appearances for the Saints before, on 17 September, he was loaned out to fellow League One side Milton Keynes Dons on a one-month deal, making his debut as a 24th-minute substitute against Walsall on 14 October. After the match, manager Paul Ince commented "We had a young lad in Oscar Gobern playing left-back, who I thought did a fantastic job." Gobern also made a brief appearance as an 89th-minute substitute against Gillingham on 17 October, when he played alongside his elder brother, Lewis, for the first time in a professional match, before returning to Southampton after making just two appearances for the Dons. He went on to make a further four appearances for the Saints that season.

Gobern's first goal in his professional career came in the 87th minute for Southampton against Cheltenham Town, in the FA Cup second round on 27 November 2010. He received his first professional red card in a 3–1 victory at Bournemouth. His first professional league goal for Southampton came on 30 April 2011 in stoppage time of a 3–0 victory at Brentford. Gobern made a total of 13 appearances for Nigel Adkins' side during the 2010–11 season as the Saints gained automatic promotion to the Football Championship, with Gobern's scoring two goals.

Huddersfield Town
On 19 June 2011, it was announced that Gobern was set to join League One club Huddersfield Town, having failed to agree a new deal at Southampton when his contract expired at the conclusion of the 2010–11 season. He signed a two-year deal with the Terriers on 1 July, and his compensation fee was decided by a tribunal on 5 September 2011 as £275,000, rising to £400,000 on appearances. He made his debut in a 1–1 draw against Bury at the Galpharm Stadium on 6 August 2011. His first goal for the Terriers came in the 3–0 win over Sheffield United at Brammall Lane on 13 September 2011. Gobern scored his second goal of the season in the club's 6–0 thrashing of Wycombe Wanderers away in January 2012, with teammate Jordan Rhodes scoring the other five. Gobern made 21 league appearances in 2011–12, scoring twice, and made a total of 25 appearances in all competitions. He helped Huddersfield secure promotion to the Championship, as the club finished the season as League One play-off winners, beating Sheffield United at Wembley Stadium.

In 2012–13, Gobern's season was disrupted by injury, with him not featuring for the Terriers until late February 2013. However, he became a key part of the side that avoided relegation and was subsequently offered a new 3-year deal, which he accepted, keeping him at the club until the summer of 2016.

Having become out of favour at Huddersfield, on 23 October 2014, Gobern joined Chesterfield on an initial one-month loan deal. The loan was ended early on 12 November.

Queens Park Rangers
On 6 August 2015, Gobern signed a one-year deal with Queens Park Rangers following a successful trial period. On 12 August 2015, Gobern made his competitive QPR debut in a 3–0 win away to Yeovil Town in the first round of the 2015–16 Football League Cup, starting the game before being replaced by Junior Hoilett.

Mansfield Town
Gobern signed for Mansfield Town in September 2016.

Ross County
On 20 January 2017, Gobern signed for Scottish Premiership club Ross County until the end of the 2016–17 season. He left at the end of the season, making only one appearance as a substitute in the Scottish Cup against Aberdeen.

Yeovil Town
On 1 December 2017, Gobern signed for Yeovil Town until the end of the season. He was offered a new contract by Yeovil at the end of the 2017–18 season.

Eastleigh
On 14 June 2018, Gobern rejected Yeovil's offer of a new contract and instead signed for National League side Eastleigh on a one-year deal.

Dover Athletic
On 6 June 2019, Gobern joined Dover Athletic on a two-year deal from 1 July. Following's Dover's decision to not play any more matches in the 2020–21 season, made in late January, and subsequent null and voiding of all results, on 5 May 2021 it was announced that Gobern was out of contract and had left the club.

Havant & Waterlooville
In August 2021, Gobern joined National League South side Havant & Waterlooville, linking up with former-Dover teammates Josh Passley and Paul Rooney who had both also joined the club that summer.

International career
Gobern has represented the country of his birth, England, at international level, having been capped by England's under-19 side in 2009, during his time at Southampton. He was called up for a friendly match against Russia Under-19s at Shrewsbury Town's ProStar Stadium in September 2009. He made his début in the match, coming on as a substitute in the 60th minute in a 2–1 victory over Russia, in what is his only appearance at international level.

Personal life
Gobern is the younger brother of fellow professional footballer Lewis Gobern, who retired in 2011.

Career statistics

Honours
Huddersfield Town
Football League One play-off winner: 2012

References

External links

1991 births
Living people
Footballers from Birmingham, West Midlands
English footballers
Association football midfielders
Southampton F.C. players
Milton Keynes Dons F.C. players
Huddersfield Town A.F.C. players
Chesterfield F.C. players
Queens Park Rangers F.C. players
Doncaster Rovers F.C. players
Mansfield Town F.C. players
Ross County F.C. players
Yeovil Town F.C. players
Eastleigh F.C. players
Dover Athletic F.C. players
Havant & Waterlooville F.C. players
English Football League players
National League (English football) players
England youth international footballers